The Mars Exploration Rover mission successfully landed and operated the rovers Spirit and Opportunity on the planet Mars from 2004 to 2018.

Spirit

Hills 
 Apollo 1 Hills
 Grissom Hill
 Columbia Hills
 Husband Hill
 McCool Hill

Craters 
 Bonneville crater
 Gusev crater
 Thira crater

Rocks 
 Adirondack
 Home Plate
 Humphrey
 Pot of Gold

Miscellaneous 
 Larry's Lookout
 Sleepy Hollow

Opportunity

Craters 
 Argo crater
 Beagle crater
 Bopolu crater
 Concepción crater
 Eagle crater
 Emma Dean crater
 Endeavour (crater)
 Cape Tribulation
 Marathon Valley
 Cape York
 Greeley Haven
 Solander Point
 Endurance crater
 Erebus crater
 Fram crater
 Naturaliste crater
 Nereus crater
 Santa Maria crater
 Victoria crater
 Cape Verde
 Vostok crater

Rocks 
 Block Island meteorite
 Bounce Rock
 El Capitan
 Heat Shield Rock
 Last Chance
 Mackinac Island meteorite
 Matijevic Hill
 Oileán Ruaidh
 Shelter Island meteorite

See also 

 List of craters on Mars 
 List of rocks on Mars

References 

Mars visited by Spirit and Opportunity, List of surface features of
Visited by Spirit and Opportunity, List of surface features of Mars
Surface features of Mars visited by Spirit and Opportunity. List of